Gibraltar Barracks is a military installation at Minley in Hampshire.

History
The Royal Engineers first arrived at Minley with an engineer brigade in the early 1970s. The corps occupied Minley Manor and initially used it as their brigade headquarters. The Queen visited the site to initiate works on modern military facilities on the opposite side of the A327 Minley Road in October 1976. The new facilities were officially opened, as Gibraltar Barracks, by General Sir William Jackson in September 1979, the manor going on to serve as its officers' mess.

Between 2008 and 2013, as part of the RSME-PPP project, the Holdfast consortium redeveloped the barracks and built a new officers' mess on the site so allowing the manor to be sold. 8th Engineer Brigade moved to Gibraltar Barracks in 2014.

In 2021, the corps headquarters of the Royal Corps of Army Music moved from Kneller Hall in Twickenham to Gibraltar Barracks.

Garrison in 2021 
The garrison of the station in 2021 includes:

 Corps Headquarters, Royal Corps of Army Music (since August 2021)
 Brigade Headquarters, 8th Engineer Brigade
 Royal School of Military Engineering (HQ based in Chatham, Kent)
 3rd Royal School of Military Engineering Regiment, Royal Engineers
 Combat Engineer School
 Mine Information and Training Centre (United Kingdom)
 Royal Engineers Trials and Development Unit
 Royal Engineers Warfare Wing

Footnotes

References 

 

Installations of the British Army
Barracks in England